"You Can Do It" is a hip-hop song by American rapper Ice Cube. It was released as the second single from the Next Friday soundtrack. The song features Ice Cube's Westside Connection bandmate Mack 10, as well as rapper Ms. Toi. "You Can Do It" later used as the lead single on Cube's sixth studio album, War & Peace Vol. 2 (The Peace Disc). The song also appears on his Greatest Hits and In the Movies compilations. It would also appear on the soundtrack for the film [[Save the Last Dance#Soundtrack|Save the Last Dance]].

The song became Ice Cube's sixth and final top 40 hit in the US, peaking at number 35 on the Billboard Hot 100, while also reaching number two on the Billboard Hot Rap Singles. In December 2004, the single was re-released in the UK and peaked at number two on the UK Singles Chart. It has sold 165,000 copies in the UK as of 2015.

Charts

Weekly charts

Year-end charts

References

External links
Top 40 Charts

1999 singles
1999 songs
Dirty rap songs
Friday (franchise) music
Ice Cube songs
Mack 10 songs
Priority Records singles
Songs written by Ice Cube
Songs written by Mack 10